The Florida Historical Society is an organization that promotes the study of the history of Florida. Incorporated in 1856, the Society collects, preserves and publishes materials relating to the history of Florida and its denizens. After being reorganized in 2002, the Society began annual meetings to provide a forum for professional historians, and others interested in Florida History. It publishes the journal Florida Historical Quarterly, originally the Florida Historical Society Quarterly, an academic journal which releases new volumes four times a year, and manages the Library of Florida History. 

Established in 1856, the Florida Historical Society is dedicated to preserving Florida's past through the collection and archival maintenance of historical documents and photographs, the publication of scholarly research on Florida history, and educating the public about Florida history through a variety of public history projects and programs. The society maintains an extensive archive at the Library of Florida History, publishes the Florida Historical Quarterly and books through the Florida Historical Society Press, manages the Historic Rossetter House Museum and Gardens, and operates the Florida Historical Society Archaeological Institute at the Brevard Museum of History and Natural Science.

Library of Florida History

Since 1905, the society has maintained the Library of Florida History. The general collection houses over 8,000 bound volumes, many rare manuscripts and postcards, over 1,000 early Florida maps and early colonial period (1500-1800) maps, soil surveys, and over 10,000 photographs of old Florida. There is an online catalog that may be used to search the collection. However, in-person research at the library is by appointment only.  This gives the archivist the opportunity to pull the requested material for you.  The library also houses the original copies of the Florida State Genealogical Society's Pioneer Descendant certificate program applications which can be accessed by appointment.  Normal operating hours are Tuesday - Saturday from 10:00 a.m. to 4:30 p.m.

The first collection was housed in the Cordova Hotel in St. Augustine, Florida before moving to Jacksonville, Gainesville, Tampa, and currently located in Cocoa, Florida since 1997.  The library is housed in a 1939 historic United States post office, constructed by the Work Projects Administration, in Historic Cocoa Village, in Brevard County, Florida.

 Henry Flagler, the American industrialist and railway magnate, donated one of the first books to the Library of Florida History's collection: a 1605 first edition of the book La Florida del Inca and the Struggle for Equality in Colonial Spanish America written by a Peruvian named Garcilaso de la Vega. La Florida del Inca chronicles the Florida expedition of Hernando de Soto, a Spanish conquistador and explorer.

Society Activities
The Florida Historical Society is an independent, member-supported, 501c(3) not-for-profit organization. The Florida  Historical Society hosts two major conferences each year: the Florida Historical Society Annual Meeting and Symposium, which is held every October on the University of Central Florida campus in Orlando, as well as the Florida Historical Society Public History Forum, which is held in May at various locations across Florida. The annual meeting and symposium features academic paper presentations and panel discussions from a range of professional historians, graduate students, among others, who have been selected to present through a juried process. The public history forum also features presentations and panels on Florida history, and often includes a tour of local historic sites, museums, and archives. 

In addition, the Historical Society also presents a weekly, half-hour radio magazine entitled the Florida Frontiers, which covers Florida history, heritage, and cultural tourism opportunities across the state. Patrons can access the radio program both through the Historical Society website, broadcast on radio stations across the state, or through iTunes and other podcasting apps. Florida Frontiers is sponsored by the Division of Historical Resources, Florida’s Space Coast Office of Tourism, the Jessie Ball duPont Fund, and the Rossetter House Foundation. 

The Florida Historical Society also coordinates educational outreach projects and programs, which include active participation in events and festivals throughout the state, frequent public talks on a variety of subjects, workshops for teachers and students, history-based theatrical presentations, exhibits, and much more.

References

External links

 
 Podcast documentary with Nick Wynne, director-emeritus of the Florida Historical Society, by RICHES

1856 establishments in Florida
Historical societies in Florida
State historical societies of the United States
Libraries in Florida